Upsilon Capricorni, Latinized from υ Capricorni, is a solitary star in the southern constellation of Capricornus. It has a reddish hue and is dimly visible to the naked eye with an apparent visual magnitude of 5.17. The star is about 730 light years from the Sun based on parallax, but is drifting closer with a radial velocity of −12 km/s. It is 0.22 degree north of the ecliptic, so is subject to lunar occultations.

This is an aging red giant star on the asymptotic giant branch with a stellar classification of M1 III, a star that has exhausted the supply of hydrogen at its core then cooled and expanded. At present it has 76 times the radius of the Sun. It is a suspected variable star of unknown type with a brightness that has been measured ranging from a peak of 5.19 down to 5.24. The star is radiating 1,283 times the luminosity of the Sun from its swollen photosphere at an effective temperature of 3,953 K.

References

M-type giants
Capricorni, Upsilon
Capricornus (constellation)
Durchmusterung objects
Capricorni, 15
196777
101984
7900